Timothy of Constantinople (fl. c. 600/700) was a Chalcedonian Christian heresiologist and presbyter of the church of Hagia Sophia in Constantinople. He wrote a treatise in Greek on Christian heresies from a Chalcedonian perspective, On Those Who Enter the Church, or On the Reception of Heretics. This pastoral work is best described as "a handbook on the procedure for admitting heretics to the church".

Timothy classifies heresies based on the requirements for admission that the orthodox church placed on their members. In his first category were those heretics who would need to be baptised before they could be accepted into the church; in the second, those who needed to be anointed but not baptised; and in the third, those who only needed to abjure all heresy (including their own former beliefs) by pronouncing an anathema. The same three categories were used by Theodore the Studite writing one or two centuries later.

In the first class, Timothy lists Manichaeans, Tascodrugites, Ebionites, Valentinians, Basilideans, Montanists, Eunomians, Paulianists, Photinians, Marcellians, Sabellians, Simonians, Menandrians, Cerinthians, Saturninians, Carpocratians, Marcosians, Apelleasts, Theodotians, Elcesaites, Nepotians, Marcionites, Artotyrites, Saccophori, Apotactics, Encratites, Hydroparastatae, Nicolaitans, Melchisedechites, Pelagians and Caelestians. These are mostly early heresies, many of them Gnostic sects. They represent theoretical problems more than actual ones, since few of them would have been active in Timothy's time. For this reason, Timothy does not distinguish between "elect" and "hearers" among the Manichaeans. He is interested in Manichaeism as a set of beliefs and not a practising sect. He does provide a valuable list of Mani's works. Theodore the Studite, taking a more practical stance, lists only the Manichaeans, Tascodrugites and Marcionites in his first class.

Timothy's second class includes Quartodecimans, Novatianists, Arians, Pneumatomachi and Apollinarians.

Timothy's third class includes the major anti-Chalcedonian sects of Nestorians and Miaphysites, a collection of sects he calls Marcianists and also the Melitians, who he says commit no error but schism. His list of Marcianists includes Messalians, Euchites, Enthusiasts, Choreuts, Lampetians, Adelphians and Eustathians. He does not name any contemporary event in connection with these sects, possibly because they were all extinct by his time. Timothy gives two slightly different lists of the miaphysite sects. The first is a list of sixteen groups Timothy labels theopaschite and the second is a list of "the schismatics called diacrinomenoi", which contains twelve groups. Together the two lists name the Eutychians, including the Dioscorians and Petrites; Acephali, who are subdivided into three sects; Julianists, who are subdivided into three sects; and Severans or Theodosians, who are subdivided into eight factions (Agnoetae, Condobaudites, Niobites, two groups of Tritheists and the factions adhering to the patriarchs Damian, Peter and Paul). He recognized Jacob of Serugh as orthodox.

Several sects mentioned by Timothy, such as the Melchisedechites, he describes as having Jewish practices, including sabbatarianism, celebration of new moons and delaying baptism.

Some passages of Timothy are preserved only by quotation in the Pandects of the 11th-century monk Nikon of the Black Mountain.


Editions

Jean-Baptiste Cotelier (ed.), Ecclesiæ græcæ monumenta, Vol. 3 (Paris: 1686), pp. 377–420 (De receptione haereticorum) and 420–424 (Ex Niconis pandecte).
Jacques Paul Migne (ed.), Patrologia Graeca, Vol. 86 (Paris: 1865), I, cols. 12–69 (De iis qui ad ecclesiam accedunt sive de receptione haereticorum) and 70–74 (Ex Niconis pandecte).

Notes

References

Further reading

C. Schmidt, "Timothy of Constantinople", in Siegmar Döpp (ed.), Dictionary of Early Christian Literature (Herder & Herder, 2000), p. 589.
F. Carcione, "Il De iis qui ad ecclesiam accedunt del presbitero constantinopolitano Timoteo. Una nuova proposta di datazione". Studi e richerche dell'Oriente cristiano 14 (1991), pp. 309–320.

7th-century Christian theologians
7th-century Byzantine people
Year of birth unknown
Year of death unknown
Byzantine theologians